Lerone is a given name. Notable people with the name include:

 Lerone Bennett Jr. (1928–2019), African-American scholar, author, and social historian
 Lerone Clarke (born 1981), Jamaican track runner
 Lerone Murphy (born 1991), English mixed martial artist

See also
 Leron